The BL 12 inch naval gun Mk I was a British rifled breech-loading naval gun of the early 1880s intended for the largest warships such as battleships and also coastal defence. It was Britain's first attempt to match the large guns being installed in rival European navies, particularly France, after Britain transitioned from rifled muzzle-loading guns to the modern rifled breech-loaders  somewhat later than the European powers. Mks I - VII all had a barrel of approximately 303 inches in length (25.25 calibres) and similar performance.

Naval service
Mk II was installed on battleships  from 1882,  and the coastal service ironclad . Mk II guns failed in service and were quickly replaced by Mks III. IV and V, with many changes and improvements.
, sister ship of Colossus.

Coast defence gun
Mks I, VI and VII were coast defence versions with trunnions for mounting on recoil slides. They were installed in forts in England at Spitbank Fort, No Man's Land Fort and Horse Sand Fort from 1884 onward and were in active service during World War I.

Ammunition

See also
List of naval guns

Notes

References

Bibliography
 Hogg, I.V. and Thurston, L.F. (1972). British Artillery Weapons & Ammunition 1914-1918. Ian Allan, London. 
 Text Book of Gunnery , 1887. London: Printed for His Majesty's Stationery Office, by Harrison and Sons, St. Martin's Lane
 Text Book of Gunnery , 1902. London: Printed for His Majesty's Stationery Office, by Harrison and Sons, St. Martin's Lane

External links

Handbook for the 12-inch B.L. 47 ton gun Mark I, VI, VII, 1891 at State Library of Victoria
Rob Brassington, Dreadnought Project : detailed Mk IV gun description and diagrams
Tony DiGiulian, British 12"/25 (30.5 cm) Marks I and II
Tony DiGiulian, British 12"/25 (30.5 cm) Marks III, IV, V and Vw

Naval guns of the United Kingdom
305 mm artillery
Victorian-era weapons of the United Kingdom
Coastal artillery